La Senda Verde is a non-government organization dedicated to environmental education and the care of sick, mistreated and abandoned wildlife. It is a privately run animal refuge in the Yungas area of Bolivia along the Yungas Road. The organization was co-founded by Vicky Ossio and Marcelo Levy in 2003.

In 2010, Corporación Minera de Bolivia began works on a gold mine in a riverbed of Coroico River. In January 2010, the movement of the river channel caused by backhoes machines flooded some parts of La Senda Verde. In the aftermath, Ossio said that the damage to the animal shelter had been tremendous.

See also

 Tourism in Bolivia
 Animal sanctuary

References

External links
 

Nature conservation in Bolivia
Animal welfare organisations based in Bolivia